The Regional Council of Lazio (Consiglio Regionale del Lazio) is the legislative assembly of Lazio.

It was first elected in 1970, when the ordinary regions were instituted, on the basis of the Constitution of Italy of 1948.

Composition
The Regional Council of Lazio was originally composed of 60 regional councillors. The number of regional councillors increased to 70 in the 2005 regional election. Following the decree-law n. 138 of 13 August 2011, the number of regional councillors was reduced to 50, with an additional seat reserved for the President of the Region.

Political groups
The Regional Council of Lazio is currently composed of the following political groups:

See also
Regional council
Politics of Lazio
President of Lazio

References

External links
Regional Council of Lazio

Politics of Lazio
Italian Regional Councils
Lazio